Physalaemus albonotatus (common name: menwig frog) is a species of frog in the family Leptodactylidae. It is found in Brazil (Mato Grosso and Mato Grosso do Sul states), Paraguay, and Chacoan Argentina and Bolivia.

Habitat
Physalaemus albonotatus occurs on the ground near semi-permanent or temporary water bodies or flooded grasslands, its breeding habitat; it also breeds in temperate ponds and roadside ditches. It adapts very well to human disturbance and is in no way threatened.

Reproduction
A study in Bodoquena (in the Mato Grosso do Sul state of southwestern Brazil) found Physalaemus albonotatus to be a continuous breeder, breeding throughout the wet season. Males called for females from the margins of ponds and flooded area, hiding in vegetation or in small depressions such as footprints. Mean clutch size was about 1500 eggs. Ovaries made about 27% of female body mass; fecundity increased with the female body size.

References

albonotatus
Amphibians of Argentina
Amphibians of Bolivia
Amphibians of Brazil
Amphibians of Paraguay
Amphibians described in 1864
Taxa named by Franz Steindachner
Taxonomy articles created by Polbot